Richard Wyatt Jr. (born 1955) is a contemporary muralist best known for his public art in and around the city of Los Angeles. His murals can be found at the Watts Towers, the Capitol Records Building, White Memorial Hospital, the Ontario Airport, the Wilshire and Western Metro station, the Union Station East Portal, and many other locations.

Early life

Wyatt was born in Lynwood, California and grew up in Compton before moving to Crenshaw, Los Angeles. Wyatt graduated from Fairfax High School.

He went on to attend the Chouinard Art Institute from 1966 to 1968 and also studied in a Tutor Art Saturday youth program at the Otis Art Institute. It was at Otis that Wyatt met and studied with Charles White, whose work was a major influence on him, and with John Riddle, who helped him improve his technique and encouraged him to address social themes in his art. Wyatt earned his B.F.A. from UCLA in 1978, and by then he had already established contacts in Los Angeles' mural movement.

Career

Wyatt showed artistic promise from an early age. When he was twelve, he won $200 at the first Watts Chalk-In, a sidewalk art contest sponsored by the Studio Watts Workshop. At thirteen, he participated in an art show at the Los Angeles Bahá’í Center, where he exhibited alongside John Outterbridge, who became a mentor and advocate. Other influential early mentors included Cecil Fergerson and Claude Booker, whom he met through his participation in the Watts Summer Festival. At the age of seventeen, Wyatt was selected to be part of the Los Angeles County Museum of Art's 1972 "Panorama of Black Artists" exhibition, which garnered him widespread recognition and effectively launched his career as a member of the city's African American artistic community.

Wyatt has worked as a teacher and lecturer, assisting John Outterbridge at the Watts Tower Arts Center from 1974–1978, and doing part-time, occasional teaching at the University of California, Irvine and at the Otis Art Institute. But since 1989, he has been able to devote himself full-time to his art.

Notes

External links
 Official website
 Artist's page at Mural Conservancy site

1955 births
Living people
Artists from Los Angeles
American muralists
African-American contemporary artists
American contemporary artists
American contemporary painters
African-American painters
UCLA School of the Arts and Architecture alumni
Chouinard Art Institute alumni
21st-century African-American people
20th-century African-American people